The Sihai Huayi Zongtu ("Complete Map of the Four Seas, China, and the Barbarians") is a Chinese world map dated to 1532, the 11th year of the Ming Dynasty's Jiajing Emperor. It is now located in the Harvard Library.

The map is oriented towards the north and displays various locations in China, as well as Korea, Siberia (as Luohuangye), Nepal and a vast India, Persia, on the central continent. Japan lies beyond the East China Sea, along with such imaginary locations as the "Land of the Pygmies". The Roman Empire appears (as Daqinguo) beyond the "Western Sea".

See also
History of Chinese cartography
Cartography of China

Historic maps of the world
16th century in China
16th-century maps and globes